Alfred Retulainen (5 March 1860, Tyrväntö – 11 November 1929) was a Finnish farmer and politician. He was a Member of the Parliament of Finland, representing the Finnish Party from 1913 to 1918 and the National Coalition Party from 1918 to 1919.

References

1860 births
1929 deaths
People from Hattula
People from Häme Province (Grand Duchy of Finland)
Finnish Party politicians
National Coalition Party politicians
Members of the Parliament of Finland (1913–16)
Members of the Parliament of Finland (1916–17)
Members of the Parliament of Finland (1917–19)
People of the Finnish Civil War (White side)